Neopseustis bicornuta is a species of moth belonging to the family Neopseustidae. It was described by D.R. Davis in 1975. It is known from the type-locality, Mount Omei, located in the south-western area of Sichuan Province, China as well as Mount Gong Gashan, also in Sichuan.

The wingspan is about 19 mm.

References

Neopseustidae